Laskuti (also Romanized as Lāskūtī; also known as Lāskū’ī) is a village in Natel-e Restaq Rural District, Chamestan District, Nur County, Mazandaran Province, Iran. At the 2006 census, its population was 27, in 10 families.

References 

Populated places in Nur County